The 2012–13 Ghanaian Premier League (known as the Glo Premier League for sponsorship reasons) season is the 54th season of top-tier football in Ghana. The competition began on 6 October 2012.

Teams and venues

Team movement
 
Teams relegated following 2011–2012 Glo Premier League season
Bechem United (Bechem, Brong-Ahafo Region)
Tudu Mighty Jets (Accra, Greater Accra Region)
Wassaman United (Tarkwa, Western Region)
Teams promoted following 2011–2012 Glo Premier League season
King Faisal Babes (Kumbasi, Ashanti Region)
Real Tamale United (Tamale, Northern Region)
Amidaus Professionals (Tema Greater Accra Region)

Standings

Top scorers

References

External links
 Season at soccerway.com

Ghana Premier League seasons
Ghanaian Premier League
1